The 2022 Memorial Cup (branded as the 2022 Memorial Cup presented by Kia for sponsorship reasons) was a four-team round-robin format ice hockey tournament held at TD Station in Saint John, New Brunswick from June 20–29, 2022. It was the 102nd Memorial Cup championship which determines the champion of the Canadian Hockey League (CHL). The tournament was hosted by the Saint John Sea Dogs, who won the right to host the tournament over the Quebec Remparts. The Saint John Sea Dogs defeated the Hamilton Bulldogs to win their second Memorial Cup. The Memorial Cup returned after two years of absence due to the coronavirus pandemic.

Host bidding process

The Quebec Major Junior Hockey League (QMJHL) considered bids from the Quebec Remparts and Saint John Sea Dogs.

Rule changes
The Canadian Hockey League made changes to the Memorial Cup rules as of 2022:

A new point system for the round-robin games: three points for a regulation win, two points for an overtime win, and one point for an overtime loss.

Overtime in the round-robin played in a 3-on-3 format in 20-minute periods until a winner is decided. The intermissions between the third period and overtime and each additional overtime period is 15 minutes.

Television timeouts eliminated during overtime. The ice surface to be cleaned in front of the goal nets and player benches at the first stoppage after the 10-minute mark of an overtime period.

Road to the Cup

OHL playoffs

QMJHL playoffs

Note: In the first two rounds seeding is determined by conference standings, and in the two final rounds seeding is determined by overall standings.

WHL playoffs

Team rosters

Saint John Sea Dogs
Head coach: Gardiner MacDougall (interim)

Shawinigan Cataractes
Head coach: Daniel Renaud

Edmonton Oil Kings
Head coach: Brad Lauer

Hamilton Bulldogs
Head coach: Jay McKee

Tournament games
All times local (UTC −3)

Round-robin

Round-robin standings

Semifinal game

Championship game

Statistical leaders

Skaters

GP = Games played; G = Goals; A = Assists; Pts = Points; PIM = Penalty minutes

Goaltenders

GP = Games played; W = Wins; L = Losses; SA = Shots against; GA = Goals against; GAA = Goals against average; SV% = Save percentage; SO = Shutouts; TOI = Time on ice (minutes)

Awards
The CHL handed out the following awards at the conclusion of the 2022 Memorial Cup:

 Stafford Smythe Memorial Trophy (Most outstanding player): William Dufour, Saint John Sea Dogs
 Ed Chynoweth Trophy (Top scorer): William Dufour, Saint John Sea Dogs
 George Parsons Trophy (Most sportsmanlike player): Logan Morrison, Hamilton Bulldogs
 Hap Emms Memorial Trophy (Best goaltender): Nikolas Hurtubise, Saint John Sea Dogs
 Memorial Cup All-Star Team:
Goaltender: Nikolas Hurtubise, Saint John Sea Dogs
Defence: Yan Kuznetsov, Saint John Sea Dogs; Arber Xhekaj, Hamilton Bulldogs
Forwards: Mavrik Bourque, Shawinigan Cataractes; William Dufour, Saint John Sea Dogs; Mason McTavish, Hamilton Bulldogs

References

External links
 Memorial Cup
 Canadian Hockey League

Memorial Cup
Memorial Cup
Memorial Cup tournaments
Ice hockey competitions in New Brunswick
Ice hockey in Saint John, New Brunswick